The Yayva is a river in Perm Krai, Russia, left tributary of the Kama.
It starts on south slope of mountain range Kvarkush, 710 m above sea level, near the border with Sverdlovsk Oblast. It flows into Kama Reservoir, lower town Berezniki and opposite of settlement Oryol, forming a bay. 
It is a mountain river upstream with many rifts and rapids; downstream it is a flat river. 

Main tributaries:
Left: Kad, Chikman, Chanva, Vilva, Usolka;
Right: Ulvich, Ik.

Etymology  
The name of the river is a composition of the Komi-permyak words yay (meat) and va (water), so it can be translated as meat river, in the sense that it is rich with fish and animals. In some documents of the 17th century the river is called Eyva.

References 

Rivers of Perm Krai